Clube Atlético Juventus (Latin for Youth), commonly referred to as Juventus da Mooca or simply Juventus, is a Brazilian professional football club in the district of Mooca, São Paulo, that competes in Campeonato Paulista Série A2, the second tier of the São Paulo state football league.

Although it was a Campeonato Brasileiro Série B (Taça de Prata) winner once, Juventus nowadays competes only in tournaments in the state of São Paulo, such as the Campeonato Paulista.

The team typically plays in maroon shirts and white shorts, and is nicknamed Moleque Travesso (the Prankster Boy).

History
Clube Atlético Juventus was founded on 20 April 1924 by Cotonificio Rodolfo Crespi employees, as Extra São Paulo.  The team colors were the colors of São Paulo state, black, white and red.

The club changed its name to Cotonifício Rodolfo Crespi Futebol Clube in 1925, and in 1930, the club changed its name again, to Clube Atlético Juventus, because Count Rodolfo Crespi was a supporter of Juventus of Italy, but the team colors are a homage to Italian club Torino Football Club, because Rodolfo Crespi's son, Adriano, was a supporter of their Turin rivals.

Pelé states his most beautiful goal was scored at Rua Javari on a Campeonato Paulista match against Juventus on 2 August 1959. As there was no video footage of this match, Pelé asked that a computer animation be made of this specific goal. This animation can be seen on Pelé Eterno, a documentary about his career.

The club won the Copa FPF for the first time in 2007, after defeating Linense in the final, and also competed in that season's edition of Recopa Sul-Brasileira. Juventus was eliminated in the Campeonato Brasileiro Série C 2007's first stage.

On 23 September 2021, the São Paulo Football Federation recognizes the São Paulo titles of 1933 and 1934, to Albion and Juventus respectively.

Achievements

Professional competitions
Campeonato Paulista: 
Winners(1): 1934 (FPF)
 Campeonato Brasileiro Série B:
 Winners (1): 1983
 Campeonato Brasileiro Série C:
 Runners-up (1): 1997
 Copa FPF:
 Winners (1): 2007
 Taça Campeonato Estadual FPF:
 Winners (1): 1934 
 Campeonato Paulista Série A2:
 Winners (2): 1929, 2005

Youth competitions
 Copa São Paulo de Futebol Júnior:
 Winners (1): 1985

Stadium

Juventus' home stadium is Estádio Rua Javari, inaugurated in 1929, with a maximum capacity of 4,000 people.

Juventus in other years

 Season 2007
 Season 2008

Notable coaches
 Basílio
 Candinho
 Edu Marangon
 Márcio Bittencourt

Symbols
The anthem's author is Carlos Alberto de Jesus Polastro.

The club is nicknamed Moleque Travesso, meaning the Mischievous Boy. The nickname was first used on September 14, 1930, by the journalist Thomaz Mazzoni, after Juventus beat Corinthians 2–1 at Estádio Parque São Jorge, which was Corinthian's home stadium at the time.

Rivals
Juventus biggest rival is Nacional; the games between the two clubs are called Juvenal. Because of the poor performances of both teams on their championships, they've been relegated to different divisions and cannot play a match between them, since 2007. However, in 2014 Nacional AC was promoted from Second Division to Division A3, where Juventus has been played for a couple of years leading to a recent edition of the Juvenal in April 2015. Portuguesa is another direct rival of Juventus. Their matches are known as The Immigrants' Derby (Italians vs Portuguese).

References

External links
 Official website
 Juventus Supporters website

 
Football clubs in São Paulo (state)
Association football clubs established in 1924
1924 establishments in Brazil
Works association football teams